Henry "Hank" Lehvonen (born August 26, 1950) is a Canadian former professional ice hockey defenceman. He played four games in the National Hockey League for the Kansas City Scouts during the 1974–75 season, with the bulk of his career, which lasted from 1970 to 1982, in the minor International Hockey League. Selected by the Minnesota North Stars in the 1970 NHL Amateur Draft, Lehvonen spent three years in the minor leagues before he joined the expansion Scouts in 1974. After his stint in the NHL he spent three more seasons in the minors, and after a year away from playing moved to Finland in 1978, where he played a further four seasons before retiring.

Career statistics

Regular season and playoffs

External links
 

1950 births
Canadian expatriate ice hockey players in Finland
Canadian expatriate ice hockey players in the United States
Canadian ice hockey defencemen
Clinton Comets players
Ice hockey people from Ontario
Ilves players
Jokerit players
Kansas City Scouts players
Kitchener Rangers players
Living people
Minnesota North Stars draft picks
Peterborough Petes (ice hockey) players
Port Huron Flags (IHL) players
Port Huron Wings players
Sportspeople from Sarnia
Toledo Goaldiggers players